Deloit Township is one of thirty-seven townships in Holt County, Nebraska, United States. The population was 106 at the 2020 census. A 2021 estimate placed the township's population at 105. The township centers around the area church, Rural St. Johns, a locally run and owned diner, and a gas station that still functions on a limited basis.

See also
County government in Nebraska

References

External links
City-Data.com

Townships in Holt County, Nebraska
Townships in Nebraska